Gaurav Nanda is an Indian actor and producer. He works in films, serials and theatre. He is a method acting coach and the founder of Actor Studio India.

He has acted in Bamdini, Parvarrish – Kuchh Khattee Kuchh Meethi, Yeh Hai Mohabbatein, and Tu Mera Hero. His latest project was Shab, which is directed by Onir. It was finished in 2017.

Early life
He studied telecommunication engineering at BMSCE Bangalore. In his first year of college, he was selected in an All India talent hunt of MTV Serial Kitni Mast Hai Zindagi, where he was among the top six applicants.

Before he started to work on projects in Mumbai, he had more than 8 years of professional training as an actor in theatre and acting. He started training  and got involved in theatre and method acting training during his college days.

His training started with Lalit Prakash, who was the head of the department of acting in the Asian Academy of Film & Television. After graduation, he moved to Mumbai to take up acting as a career, taking a course at Whistling Woods International under Naseeruddin Shah.

Career 
He got his first break in films in the film Sorry Bhai!. In 2008, he got a role in a mythological serial on Indian TV, Kahaani Hamaaray Mahaabhaarat Ki by Balaji Telefilms.

He has studied internationally at the National School of Drama (NSD), Film and Television Institute of India (FTII), London Academy of Music and Dramatic Art(LAMDA), Lee Strasberg Theatre and Film Institute among others. He has also studied physical theatre.

Filmography

Films

2017 Shab (Film) as Baljeet
 2014 The Orphan:New Kind of Hero (announced) (Hollywood film) as Kanaan
 2014 Maal Road Dilli (postproduction) as Bobby 
 2014 Motives (postproduction) (Hollywood film) as Officer Ghosley
 2012 Heroine (film) as fashion designer
 2010 Break Ke Baad (film) as theatre director(Adhoore Song)
 2010 Aisha (film) as guitarist(Sham Song)
 2008 Sorry Bhai! (film) as student

Television
2016-Crime Patrol For Sony Entertainment Television (India)
2016 - Darr Sabko Lagta Hai For &TV As Sudheer 
2016 - Pyaar Tune Kya Kiya As Mr. Thomas For Zing
2015 – Tu Mera Hero As Gulshan For StarPlus
 2015 – Kalash - Ek Vishwaas As Mayank Mittal For Life OK
 2014-15- Yeh Hai Mohabbatein as Rajeev Tandon For StarPlus
 2015 Gumrah: End of Innocence Season 5 For Channel V
 2015 Code Red On Colors TV
2015 Savdhaan India For Life OK
2015 Kismat Connection For Sahara One
2015 Halla Bol For Bindass
2015 Laut Aao Trisha For Life OK
2015 Fear Files: Darr Ki Sacchi Tasvirein For Zee TV
2015 Tujhse Naaraz Nahi Zindagi For &TV
 2014 Ajeeb Daastaan Hai Ye as Anil For Life OK
 2014 Mujahid-e-Azadi Ashfaqulla Khan as Ashfaqulla Khan
 2012 Parvarrish – Kuchh Khattee Kuchh Meethi as Amit Kapoor For Sony
 2012 Amrit Manthan as Bhupinder Singh (CM) and Pritam Bakshi For Life OK
 2010 Raaz Pichhle Janam Ka 2 as Himself
 2010 Bandini as Tehsildar For NDTV Imagine
 2010 Behenein as Raman For StarPlus
 2008 Kahaani Hamaaray Mahaabhaarat Ki as Gargacharaya For 9X

References

External links
Gaurav Nanda Official website

Actor Studio India Official website

Indian male film actors
Indian male television actors
Indian male models
Male actors in Hindi cinema
Indian television presenters
Living people
Male actors from Mumbai
Punjabi people
Year of birth missing (living people)